Oleksandr Chepelyuk (born 5 September 1997 in Lutsk, Volyn Oblast, Ukraine) is a professional Ukrainian football midfielder who plays for Volyn Lutsk.

Chepelyuk is a product of FC Volyn Youth Sportive School System. His first trainer was Mykola Klyots. Then he signed a professional contract with  FC Volyn Lutsk in the Ukrainian Premier League.

He made his debut in the Ukrainian Premier League for FC Volyn on 29 November 2015, playing in a match against FC Metalurh Zaporizhya.

References

External links
Profile at Official FFU Site (Ukr)

Living people
1997 births
Footballers from Lutsk
Ukrainian footballers
Association football midfielders
Ukrainian Premier League players
FC Volyn Lutsk players
FC Rukh Lviv players
FC Hirnyk-Sport Horishni Plavni players
Ukrainian First League players
Sportspeople from Volyn Oblast